Kiran Powar (born 6 April 1976), is an Indian cricketer. He is a left-handed batsman and a right-arm offbreak bowler and is the brother of Ramesh Powar.

Playing career 

Powar led the U-19 team that visited Australia in 1994/95 season. The series was lost 2–0 (Test matches) and 2–1 (Youth ODI). Powar was inconsistent in the series and had one score of fifty in the ODI match leading India to their sole tour victory and a century in the fourth innings of the final test that was lost to Australia.

Powar made his debut in Ranji Trophy domestic cricket in the 1996/97 season but with the overcrowded Mumbai batting talent, moved his skills to Goa in 1997/98. He represented Assam in one season (2003/04) and moved to Vadodara in 2004/05 season. He stopped playing List A cricket in 2005/06 season but continues to play Ranji cricket.the never achieved his true potential. He never received an opportunity to play International Cricket and retired from domestic cricket after the 2003/04 season.

ICL career 

He was one of the cricketer who signed for unofficial Indian Cricket League and one of the star for Mumbai Champs an ICL team.

Coaching career 

In 2012, Powar was named as under-19s coach of Vidarbha cricket team.

References

External links
 

1976 births
Living people
Cricketers from Mumbai
Indian cricketers
Mumbai cricketers
Goa cricketers
Baroda cricketers
Assam cricketers
East Zone cricketers
ICL World XI cricketers
Mumbai Champs cricketers
South Zone cricketers
West Zone cricketers
Indian cricket coaches